The 2010–11 NOJHL season is the 33rd season of the Northern Ontario Junior Hockey League (NOJHL). The eight teams of the East and West Divisions will play 50-game schedules.

Come February, the top teams of each division will play down for the Copeland-McNamara Trophy, the NOJHL championship.  The winner of the Copeland-McNamara Trophy will compete in the Central Canadian Junior "A" championship, the Dudley Hewitt Cup.  If successful against the winners of the Ontario Junior Hockey League and Superior International Junior Hockey League, the champion would then move on to play in the Canadian Junior Hockey League championship, the 2011 Royal Bank Cup.

Changes 
No major changes.

Current Standings 
Note: GP = Games played; W = Wins; L = Losses; OTL = Overtime losses; SL = Shootout losses; GF = Goals for; GA = Goals against; PTS = Points; x = clinched playoff berth; y = clinched division title; z = clinched conference title

Standings listed on official league website.

2010-11 Copeland-McNamara Trophy Playoffs

Playoff results are listed on the official league website.

Dudley Hewitt Cup Championship
Hosted by the Huntsville Otters in Huntsville, Ontario.  The Soo Eagles finished in third place.

Round Robin
Huntsville Otters (OJHL) 6 - Soo Eagles 4
Wellington Dukes (OJHL) 7 - Soo Eagles 1
Soo Eagles 2 - Wisconsin Wilderness (SIJHL) 1 in quadruple overtime
Semi-final
Wellington Dukes (OJHL) 3 - Soo Eagles 2 in quadruple overtime

Scoring leaders 
Note: GP = Games played; G = Goals; A = Assists; Pts = Points; PIM = Penalty minutes

Leading goaltenders 
Note: GP = Games played; Mins = Minutes played; W = Wins; L = Losses: OTL = Overtime losses; SL = Shootout losses; GA = Goals Allowed; SO = Shutouts; GAA = Goals against average

Award winners
Player of the Year: Brett Campbell (Blind River Beavers)
Best Defenceman: Joel Gagnon (Sudbury Jr. Wolves)
Most Improved Player: Darnell Koosees (North Bay Trappers)
Mitch Tetreault Memorial Trophy (Top Defensive Forward): Jake Wright (Soo Thunderbirds)
NOJHL Award (Top Goaltender): Michael Doan, Remo Febbraro (Soo Thunderbirds)
Wayne Chase Memorial Award (Best GAA): Michael Doan (Soo Thunderbirds)
Jimmy Conners Memorial Trophy (Scoring Champion): Andre Leclair (Temiscaming Royals)
Carlo Cattarello Trophy (Most Valuable Player): Jerry Petingalo (Soo Thunderbirds)
John Grignon Trophy (Top Rookie): Erik Robichaud (Abitibi Eskimos)
Onaping Falls Huskies Trophy (Most Gentlemanly): Joshua Clancy (Abitibi Eskimos)
Best Team Player: Brett Campbell (Blind River Beavers)
Scholastic Player of the Year: Geoff Gieni (Soo Thunderbirds)
Playoffs Most Valuable Player: Jake Paterson (Soo Eagles)
Mirl "Red" McCarthy Memorial Trophy (Top Coach): Bruno Bragagnolo (Soo Eagles)
Joe Drago Trophy (Top Executive): Chris Dawson (North Bay Trappers)

See also 
 2011 Royal Bank Cup
 Dudley Hewitt Cup
 List of NOHA Junior A seasons
 Ontario Junior Hockey League
 Superior International Junior Hockey League
 Greater Ontario Junior Hockey League

References

External links 
 Official website of the Northern Ontario Junior Hockey League
 Official website of the Canadian Junior Hockey League

NOJHL
Northern Ontario Junior Hockey League seasons